Kłosowski is a surname. Notable people with the surname include:

George Chapman (murderer) (born Seweryn Kłosowski; 1865–1903), Polish serial killer
Dolores Klosowski (1923–2016), All-American Girls Professional Baseball League player
John Kloss (born John Klosowski; 1937–1987), American fashion designer
Roman Kłosowski (1929–2018), Polish actor
Sławomir Kłosowski (born 1964), Polish politician
Theresa Klosowski, All-American Girls Professional Baseball League player

See also
 Klossowski (born Balthasar Klossowski de Rola; 1908–2001), Polish-French modern artist
 Klonowski, a surname